The Sports Journalists' Association (SJA) is an association for British sports journalists. It represents the British sports media on the British Olympic Association's press advisory committee and acts as a consultant to organizers of major events who need guidance on media requirements as well as seeking to represent its members' interests in a range of activities. Its president is Patrick Collins, the distinguished former sports columnist for The Mail on Sunday, who succeeded veteran broadcaster and columnist Sir Michael Parkinson in the role. Membership is open to journalists, photographers, broadcasters, reporters, editors, and cartoonists. However, in order to obtain a full membership you have to be a journalist based in the United Kingdom.

History 
The association was founded in 1948, as the Sports Writers' Association. Following a merger with the Professional Sports Photographers' Association in 2002, the organization changed its title to the more inclusive Sports Journalists' Association. Furthermore, the SJA worked alongside the Glasgow Commonwealth Games. Being the driving force behind its development, the recognition that the Commonwealth Games brought to the Sports Journalists Association helped SJA to become known in the sport of rugby. Since then, the SJA has been very successful. In 2012, the Sports Journalists' Association was fortunate to be included within the 10,000 other colleagues involved at the Olympics in London.

The SJA hosts the oldest sports awards ceremony in Britain, which began in 1949. The SJA British Sports Awards essentially honors the outstanding journalists and their work within the field. Ladbrokes, The National Lottery, and BT Sports are all companies who support and sponsor events hosted by the SJA.

Awards 
It stages two prestigious awards events, an annual Sports Awards ceremony which recognises outstanding performances by British sportsmen and women during the previous year, and the British Sports Journalism Awards, the industry's "Oscars", sponsored by UK Sport and presented each March.

In March 2008, Martin Samuel, then the chief football correspondent of The Times, was named British Sportswriter of the Year, the first time any journalist had managed to win the award three years in succession. At the same awards, Jeff Stelling, of Sky Sports, was named Sports Broadcaster of the Year for the third time, a prize determined by a ballot of SJA members. Stelling won the vote again the following year, when the Sunday Timess Paul Kimmage won the interviewer of the year prize for a fifth time.
The awards for broadcasters have subsequently widened in scope and are now chosen by a panel of judges. They are regarded as highly prestigious within the industry.

Events 
The Sports Journalists' Association holds events that cover various causes. Whether they are social or informative events, the SJA plays an important role in sports media. Members are welcomed to participate and enjoy activities involving horse racing, golf, and cricket. For those not interested in social events like so, they're open to join in on a Masterclass. By attending one of these masterclasses, information will be shared by leading sports journalists that may possibly enhance the skills of a sports journalist.

British Sports Journalism Awards 
As discussed by the British Sports Journalists' Association (SJA), the Awards hosted involve the commemorating of all sports writers. Whether they are involved in daily, weekly, regional, or national newspapers, news agencies, websites and specialist magazines are all subject to win.
 The John Bromley Sportswriter of the Year award
 The Ed Lacey Trophy for the Sports Photographer of the Year
 The Sports Newspaper of the Year
 The Doug Gardner Award
 Sports Newspaper of the Year
 Broadcast Sports Presenter
 Broadcast Journalist
 Television Sport Live Broadcast
 Radios Sport Live Broadcast
 Television Sport Documentary
 Radio Sport Documentary
 Best Special Package
 Laureus Sports Website
 Specialist Sports Website
 Sports Scoop
 Ladbrokes Specialist Correspondent
 Investigative Sports Reporter
 Sports Columnist
 Sports Feature Writer
 Sports News Reporter
 Cricket Writer
 Football Writer
 Rugby Writer
 Regional Writer
 Young Sports Writer
 David Welch Student Sports Writer
 Sports Picture
 Sports Portfolio
 Specialist Sports Portfolio
 Sports News Picture

British Sports Awards 
The British Sports Awards is an award ceremony that the Sports Journalists' Association holds to honor all notable men and woman athletes. The oldest Sports ceremony of their kind to date.
 SJA Sportswoman of the Year
 SJA Sportsman of the Year
 SJA Team of the Year
 The National Lottery Spirit of Sport Award
 SJA President's Award
 BT Sport JL Manning Award for services off the field of play
 SJA Committee Award
 SJA Bill McGowran Trophy for achievement in Paralympic sport
 SJA Peter Wilson Trophy for international newcomer
 SJA Chairman's Award
 SJA Pat Besford Award for outstanding performance of the year

Sports Media LGBT+ 

The SJA is connected to the Sports Media LGBT+ network, which aims to provide a space for LGBT+ people and allies working in sports journalism, TV production, public relations and all other sports media related roles, to connect in person and online, in order to share experiences, advice, content ideas, and other professional support and assistance.

References

External links 
 

British journalism awards
Journalism-related professional associations
Sports journalism organizations in Europe
Sports organizations established in 1948
United Kingdom journalism organisations